Samuel Sarpong is a Ghanaian politician and a former Ashanti Regional Minister of Ghana. Prior to heading the Ashanti Region, he was the Central Regional Minister. Former Kumasi Metropolitan Chief Executive.

He is a member of the National Democratic Congress in Ghana.

Early life and education 
Samuel Sarpong was born on 10 November 1957 at Ejisu in the Ashanti Region. He is the 1st born of the seven children born to Mr. and Mrs. Agnes Kwabena Mensah Sarpong. He attended Owabi L/A Primary School and Osei Tutu Senior Secondary School in 1973.  

He obtained his GCE O level Certificate in 1978 and he pursued a three year Teacher Training education at Wesley College in Kumasi.  Samuel Sarpong taught as a sports teacher at Juabeng Secondary School between 1981 and 1984.

References

Living people
National Democratic Congress (Ghana) politicians
Presbyterian Boys' Senior High School alumni
Mayors of Kumasi
Year of birth missing (living people)